Kumhar Mandi ,  is a neighbourhood in Multan, Punjab, Pakistan. It is located at the start of Shujabad Road while turning towards Chowk Nagshah from Chowk Double Phatak. It is the main market for Muslim Colony residentials. Majority of people here speak Seraiki and Punjabi as a native language. Arslan Majid is a famous IT Professional and he lives in this area. Former prime minister Syed Yousaf Raza Gillani named flyover lands in this area on Shujabad road. Many residentials use this flyover for morning walk or exercise.

Populated places in Multan District